Elongation of very long chain fatty acids protein 4 is a protein that in humans is encoded by the ELOVL4 gene.

ELOVL4 is a member of a large family of fatty acid elongases (ELO), that catalyzes the rate-limiting step in the elongation of long chain fatty acids (LC-FA) into very long -chain saturated (VLC-SFA) and polyunsaturated (VLC-PUFA) fatty acids, collectively known as VLC-FA (very long chain fatty acid). ELOVL4 and its products are found in the brain, skin, retina, Meibomian glands, testes and sperm.  Known mutations of ELOVL4 in humans cause diseases such as Autosomal Dominant Stargardt-like Macular Dystrophy (STGD3), Spinocerebellar Ataxia-34 (SCA34), skin deformities and seizures.

See also 
 Stargardt disease

References

Further reading